Barbers Bridge railway station was on the Ledbury and Gloucester Railway in Gloucestershire, England. It was opened on 27 July 1885 and it closed to passengers on 13 July 1959, and then fully closed in 1964.

The station was located just to the east of Tibberton village, on the west side of the B4215 road.

References

Further reading

 

Disused railway stations in Gloucestershire
Former Great Western Railway stations
Railway stations in Great Britain opened in 1885
Railway stations in Great Britain closed in 1959